Church Stretton School is an 11–16 mixed secondary school with academy status in Church Stretton, Shropshire, England.

Previously a community school administered by Shropshire Council, Church Stretton School converted to academy status in April 2013. The school is now part of the South Shropshire Academy Trust, along with Stokesay Primary School in Craven Arms. However both schools continue to coordinate with Shropshire Council for admissions.

Notable alumni

References

External links
 

Secondary schools in Shropshire
Church Stretton
Academies in Shropshire